Roberto "Kitoy" Cruz (born August 18, 1972) is a Filipino taekwondo practitioner. He is the most bemedalled taekwondo player in international competition for the Philippines. He competed in the 1990s and was at the tail-end of a long illustrious career when he competed in the 2000 Sydney Olympics.  He currently serves as one of the national coaches for the country.

Awards and achievements
Listed are some of his international achievements:
3 Time Silver Medalist - 12th, 13th & 14th - 1995, 1997 & 1999 World Taekwondo Championships 
2 Bronze Medalist - 15th & 16th - 2001, 2003 World Taekwondo Championships
2 Time Bronze Medalist - 1998 & 2001  World Cup Taekwondo Championships
Gold Medalist - 1999 2nd Asian Olympic Qualifying Tournament
2 Time Silver Medalist - 11th, 12th: 1994, 1996 Asian Taekwondo Championships
6 Time Gold Medalist - South East Asian Games (Biennial Games 1991–2001)

References

External links
 
 

Living people
Filipino male taekwondo practitioners
1972 births
Taekwondo practitioners at the 1998 Asian Games
Taekwondo practitioners at the 2002 Asian Games
Southeast Asian Games gold medalists for the Philippines
Southeast Asian Games competitors for the Philippines
Southeast Asian Games medalists in taekwondo
Competitors at the 1991 Southeast Asian Games
Competitors at the 1995 Southeast Asian Games
Competitors at the 1997 Southeast Asian Games
Competitors at the 1999 Southeast Asian Games
Competitors at the 2001 Southeast Asian Games
Asian Games competitors for the Philippines
World Taekwondo Championships medalists
Asian Taekwondo Championships medalists
Taekwondo practitioners at the 2000 Summer Olympics